Carrasco Norte is a barrio (neighbourhood or district) of Montevideo, Uruguay.

Location
It borders Las Canteras to the west, Bañados de Carrasco to the north, the Canelones Department to the north and to the east, Carrasco to the south and Punta Gorda to the southwest.

The Carrasco Creek separates this neighbourhood from Canelones Department.

Educational facilities
Many excellent private schools which are traditionally called "schools from Carrasco" are located here, among others:
 Stella Maris College (Montevideo)
 The British Schools of Montevideo

Places of worship

 St. Joseph of the Mountain Chapel, Cooper 2263 (Roman Catholic, Carmelites)
 Armenian Evangelical Temple of Carrasco Norte (Armenian Evangelical)

See also 
Barrios of Montevideo

References

External links

Barrios of Montevideo